Asshole is the second solo studio album by Kiss's Gene Simmons and it was released in 2004 on Sanctuary Records. Its controversial title does not appear on the front cover. On the side of the CD case the title reads "asshole". "It's just another way of me saying, 'I don't care what anyone says about me," Simmons declared. "I'm preempting what people say and therefore diffusing the power of my detractors."

Background
The album contains a song cowritten by Bob Dylan. "A lot of Bob Dylan's lyrics just make me take a breath and go, 'Okay, I will never be in that class," Simmons remarked. "If you look at the lyrics to one song – The Times They Are a-Changin' or Blowin' in the Wind – that's a lifetime achievement."

"Black Tongue" was based on an unfinished song of the same name composed by Frank Zappa. Simmons licensed a recording of Zappa playing the initial riff and built a new composition around it, with playing by Dweezil Zappa and backup vocals by Dweezil, Ahmet Zappa, Moon Unit Zappa and Frank Zappa's widow, Gail.

Dave Navarro plays guitar on the Prodigy cover "Firestarter".

Track listing

The Japanese edition featured two bonus tracks: Everybody Knows and You're My Reason For Living.

Personnel
 Gene Simmons – vocals, rhythm guitars and bass on track 3, bass on tracks 1, 7, 10, 11
 Mark Addison – drums, bass, keyboards, guitar, background vocals on track 5
 Michelle Casio – background vocals on track 8
 Dan Cuprier – drums on track 8
 Jeff Diehl – keyboards on track 7
 Zachary Grant – background vocals on track 7
 Richie Kotzen – guitars on tracks 10, 11
 Bruce Kulick – guitars on tracks 1 & 3
 Brian LeBarton – piano on track 8
 Hollad McRae – lead guitar on track 8
 Dave Navarro – guitar on track 2
 Kylie O'Brien – background vocals on track 7
 Chris Parrish – background vocals on track 11
 Steve Parrish – background vocals on track 11
 Thomas Ruud – lead guitar, rhythm guitar on track 6
 Eric Singer – drums on tracks 1 & 3
 Nina Singh – drums, guitar, percussion, background vocals on track 5
 Frank Albin Tostrup – drums, bass, rhythm guitars, percussion on track 6
 Louise Tweed – background vocals on track 8
 Shannon Tweed – background noise on track 8
 Nick Tweed Simmons – background vocals on track 11
 Sophie Tweed Simmons – background vocals on track 7
 Nira Weiss – background vocals on track 8
 Dave Williams – background vocals on track 8
 Ahmet Zappa – background vocals on track 10
 Dweezil Zappa – guitar solo, background vocals on track 10
 Frank Zappa – guitars, voice on track 10
 Moon Zappa – background vocals on track 10
 Gail Zappa – background vocals on track 10

Charts

References

Gene Simmons albums
2004 albums
Sanctuary Records albums
Albums produced by Gene Simmons